FK Kadino is a football club based in the village of Kadino near Skopje, North Macedonia. They are currently competing in the Macedonian Third League (North Division).

History
The club was founded in 1969.

References

External links
Club info at MacedonianFootball 
Football Federation of Macedonia 

Kadino
Association football clubs established in 1969
1969 establishments in the Socialist Republic of Macedonia
Ilinden Municipality